Horehronie (also Upper Hron River region or Horné Pohronie or Felső-Garammente) is a tourism and geographic region of Slovakia. It is situated in the Banská Bystrica and Brezno districts and encompasses the upper Hron River valley and the surrounding Low Tatra mountain ranges. The Slovak entry for the Eurovision Song Contest 2010 was "Horehronie", an ode to the region, performed by singer Kristína.

References

External links
 www.horehronie.com
 Horehronie

Traditional regions of Slovakia